Oecanthus forbesi, the Forbes' tree cricket, is a species of tree cricket in the family Gryllidae. It is found in North America.

Description
This species has a yellowish head with black markings on the first two antennal segments.

O. forbesi is very similar to O. nigricornis. The two species can be reliably separated only by the pulses per second (p/sec) of the male's song.

The male sings by stridulation, and the p/sec increases with temperature. The song of the male below was measured at 55-56 p/sec in temperature of about 15 degrees Celsius (°C).

References

External links

forbesi